Wardrop is a name of Scottish origin and appears to be a corruption of the name "Wardrobe", meaning keeper of clothes. It may refer to:

 Sir Alexander Wardrop (1872–1961), British Army General
 Andrew Wardrop (c.1740–1789), Scottish surgeon 
 Anthony Wardrop (born 1973), Australian volleyball player
 Bert Wardrop (born 1932), British swimmer
 Jack Wardrop (born 1932), former Scottish Olympic swimmer
 James Wardrop (1782–1869), Scottish surgeon
 John Glen Wardrop (1886–1969), British transport analyst
 Marjory Wardrop (1869–1909), British literary scholar
 Martha Wardrop, Scottish Green politician
 Mike Wardrop, English footballer
 Sir Oliver Wardrop (1864–1948), British diplomat, traveller and translator
 Sam Wardrop (born 1997), Scottish footballer

References